Frank Otto Gause (February 11, 1905 – August 15, 1972) was an American football player. Gause was born in 1905 in Minneapolis. He was a star football player at Minneapolis' North High School in the early 1920s. He played professional football in the National Football League (NFL) as a center and guard for the Minneapolis Red Jackets. He appeared in three NFL games, two as a starter, during the 1929 season. He also played for the Ace Box Lunch team in 1931. He died in 1976 in Minneapolis.

References

1905 births
1972 deaths
Minneapolis Red Jackets players
Players of American football from Minnesota
People from Minneapolis